One by One is a traditionally animated short film directed by Pixote Hunt and released by Walt Disney Pictures on August 31, 2004, as an extra feature on the DVD release of The Lion King II: Simba's Pride Special Edition. The short was intended to be one of the segments for the proposed but never completed Fantasia 2006.

Plot
The film shows a story of children from a South African town flying kites down a hill after one boy is inspired by a colourful feather floating from the sky. The children find materials from places all over the town and produce equally colourful kites. After a walk, they fly the kites and release them into the sky for the ending of the film.

Production
The short film takes its title and inspiration from One by One, a "freedom song" written and performed by Lebo M for The Lion King. Although the song was cut from the final film, it did make it into the Disney Theatrical adaptation, before being used on this short.

Credits 
Directed by Pixote Hunt
Co-Directed by David A. Bossert
Executive Producer: Roy Edward Disney
Producer: Don Hahn
Co-Producer: Baker Bloodworth
Associate Producer: David Steinberg
Art Direction: Mike Humphries
Music Composed, Arranged and Produced by Lebo M
Lead Vocal Performance by Lebo M

See also 
List of Disney animated shorts
The Lion King II: Simba's Pride: Special Edition 2-Disc DVD

References

External links

2000s Disney animated short films
2004 animated films
2004 films
Animated films without speech
Films set in South Africa
Films produced by Don Hahn
Films directed by Pixote Hunt
Fantasia (franchise)
2000s English-language films